Bratt may refer to the following:

Given name
Bratt Sinclaire (born 1967), Italian music producer

Surname
Benjamin Bratt (born 1963), American actor
Bill Bratt (born 1945), English football official
Carolyn Bratt (born 1943), American lawyer and activist
Edith Bratt (1889–1971), birth name of Edith Tolkien, English wife of J. R. R. Tolkien
Eyvind Bratt (1907–1987), Swedish diplomat
Harold Bratt (1939–2018), English footballer
James Bratt (born 1949), American scholar
Jesper Bratt (born 1998), Swedish ice hockey player
Lisen Bratt (born 1976), Swedish Olympic equestrian
Peter Bratt (born 1944), Swedish journalist
Ruth Bratt, English actress and comedian
Steve Bratt (born 1957), American internet entrepreneur
Torbjørn Bratt (c.1502–1548), Norwegian clergyman
Will Bratt (born 1988), British racing driver

Places
Bratt-Smiley House, a historic house in Arkansas, U.S.

Other
Bratt pan, a large cooking pan
Bratt system, Swedish system to control alcohol consumption
Bratwurst, a type of German sausage

See also
 Brat (disambiguation)
 Bratt System

English-language surnames
Swedish-language surnames